Yawhen Zhuk is a Belarusian-Israeli retired professional association football player. He started his career in Belarus, before moving to Israel in 2004 and acquiring Israeli citizenship with application of Law of Return.

External links
 Profile at teams.by
 
 

1976 births
Living people
Belarusian footballers
Israeli footballers
Belarusian expatriate footballers
Israeli Premier League players
Liga Leumit players
Expatriate footballers in Lithuania
Expatriate footballers in Poland
Expatriate footballers in Israel
FC Dinamo-Juni Minsk players
FC Torpedo Minsk players
FC Luninets players
Wisła Płock players
FK Žalgiris players
FC Partizan Minsk players
FC Belshina Bobruisk players
FC Darida Minsk Raion players
FC SKVICH Minsk players
Bnei Sakhnin F.C. players
Hapoel Ironi Kiryat Shmona F.C. players
Maccabi Be'er Sheva F.C. players
FC Savit Mogilev players
FC Slutsk players
Association football defenders